Cervical conization (CPT codes 57520 (Cold Knife) and 57522 (Loop Excision)) refers to an excision of a cone-shaped sample of tissue from the mucous membrane of the cervix. Conization may be used for either diagnostic purposes as part of a biopsy or therapeutic purposes to remove pre-cancerous cells.

Types include:
 Cold knife conization (CKC): usually outpatient, occasionally inpatient
 Loop electrical excision procedure (LEEP): usually outpatient.

Conization of the cervix is a common treatment for dysplasia following abnormal results from a pap smear.

Side effects
Cervical conization causes a risk for subsequent pregnancies ending up in preterm birth of approximately 30% on average, due to cervical incompetence.

See also
 Cervicectomy

References

Biopsy
Diagnostic obstetrics and gynaecology
Medical terminology
Surgical oncology